Derb-e Ruz Ali (also Romanized as Derb-e Rūz ‘Alī; also known as Dabar-e Rūz ‘Alī) is a village in Tashan-e Sharqi Rural District, Tashan District, Behbahan County, Khuzestan Province, Iran. At the 2006 census, its population was 40, in 7 families.

References 

Populated places in Behbahan County